James Jarvie (born 30 September 1980) is a Scottish actor from Dunfermline in Fife, Scotland. A trained martial artist, Jarvie's acting career began in 2010. His film debut will take place early spring 2014.

Early life 

James Jarvie was born in Dunfermline and was brought up in High Valleyfield, Fife. He has a twin brother, and an older sister. His father is a former soldier who served in the Scottish Black Watch regiment.

Acting career 

A recent student of the dramatic arts, Jarvie debuts in an apocalyptic thriller in spring 2014.

Martial arts career 

Jarvie has over 13 years of martial arts experience. He began his foundational training with Muay Thai at the age of 19 at the Fighting Fit Gym in Kirkcaldy. He has fought in 21 Muay Thai and K1 fights in the UK and held the Scottish Thai Boxing Association light middleweight title from 2005 for 5 years. In 2004, he was runner up in the final of K1 Scotland. Jarvie has also trained in Brazilian jiu-jitsu (BJJ), winning a white belt tournament at the Rio International Open Jiu-Jitsu Championship in 2009, as well as competing in various BJJ competitions since. He gained his purple belt under Christian Graugart, who is considered to be the original BJJ Globetrotter. Jarvie has fought and won 3 pro Mixed Martial Arts (MMA)  fights, winning each fight via submission in under one minute. He was the Scottish Gladiators Professional light welterweight MMA Champion in 2008. Jarvie fought his last MMA fight in 2009. Since then he has been coaching fighters in Muay Thai, MMA and conditioning fitness in his spare time at Headhunter's Martial Arts Academy  gyms in Edinburgh and Falkirk.

Personal life 

When not acting or coaching, Jarvie enjoys travelling and keeping himself active. He goes climbing in the Lake District and the Shawangunk Ridge in New York. He also goes surfing in Rio de Janeiro and occasionally goes snowboarding in Scotland. Jarvie regularly carries out charity work. For example, he provided medical aid in Haiti after the 2010 Haiti earthquake.

References 

1980 births
Living people
Sportspeople from Dunfermline
People from Dunfermline
Scottish male mixed martial artists
Mixed martial artists utilizing Muay Thai
Mixed martial artists utilizing Brazilian jiu-jitsu
Scottish Muay Thai practitioners
Scottish practitioners of Brazilian jiu-jitsu